The 1897 Iowa gubernatorial election was held on November 2, 1897. Republican nominee L. M. Shaw defeated Democratic nominee Frederick Edward White with 51.27% of the vote.

General election

Candidates
Major party candidates
L. M. Shaw, Republican
Frederick Edward White, Democratic 

Other candidates
S. P. Leland, Prohibition
Charles Lloyd, People's
John Cliggett, National Democratic
M. J. Kremer, Socialist Labor

Results

References

1897
Iowa